Baiyin is a prefecture-level city in northeastern Gansu province, People's Republic of China. Established in the 1950s as a base for mining non-ferrous metals, its mines are becoming exhausted in recent decades, requiring the city to reinvent its economy.

Geography and climate

Baiyin is part loess plateau, part desert. The climate is very arid with only  of annual precipitation. The Yellow River flows from south to north for  through Baiyin.

Administration
Baiyin has 2 urban districts, 3 counties, 64 townships, 18 towns, and 7 sub-districts with a total population of 1,746,800(2011).

Economy
The Baiyin Nonferrous operates copper, zinc and selenium mines around Baiyin, although these mines are getting exhausted of ore. Financed by development funds, a high-tech park is being built, which is home to a contact lens factory. Pingchuan District and Huining County are the largest coal production bases in Gansu province.

The Yinguang Group, a subsidiary of Norinco, operates a major factory making chemicals for defense and civilian use, the factory was a key project of the first five-year plan.

Transportation
Baiyin is directly served by the Baotou–Lanzhou railway, Honghui railway, China National Highway 109, China National Highway 341 and G6 Beijing–Lhasa Expressway.

Notable people
 Chen Hualan – veterinary virologist

References

External links
Official Website (Chinese)

 
Prefecture-level divisions of Gansu